St Weonards (correctly pronounced 'wonnards') is a village and civil parish in Herefordshire, England, located  south of Hereford,  west of Ross-on-Wye and  north of Monmouth, on the A466 road.  Within the parish and also on the A466 is the hamlet of Sandyway. St Weonards  lies within the area known to the Saxons (and later English) as Archenfield, previously the kingdom of Ergyng, adjoining the modern border with Wales.  Ergyng was later reduced to a semi-autonomous cantref retaining Welsh language and customs until the early nineteenth century.

St Weonards Church
The parish church is dedicated to St Weonard, who may have been a local Celtic saint.  Old stained glass in the church, now destroyed, described him as a hermit and showed him with a woodcutter's axe.  His name is spelled in various ways, including Wannard and Gwennarth.

The church was first mentioned in a charter of 1155.  The chancel arch, part of the south wall, and the inner doorway of the porch, date from the 13th and 14th centuries, as does a large wooden chest.  Most of the current church building dates from the early 16th century, when it was enlarged by the building of the north aisle, south porch and tower.  The internal oak screens date from the same period, as does the Mynors Chapel, built for the family who owned, and still own, Treago Castle.  The pulpit dates from the 17th century.  The chancel was enlarged in 1884, and the south vestry added.  The churchyard contains the remains of a 15th-century cross base.

St Weonards Tump
This was traditionally the burial place of St Weonard, in a golden coffin. Excavations in 1855 revealed two cremation burials dating from the Bronze Age within the mound. The tump seems to have been used by the Normans as a motte for a small wooden castle, and in later centuries was used as the site of morris dancing and other village festivities.

Treago Castle

It is believed to have been built around 1480 by Sir Richard Mynors, who was Sheriff of Herefordshire in 1500, on land which had been owned by his family at least since the 14th century. The castle is set within parkland, and is still privately owned by the Mynors family.

References

External links

Villages in Herefordshire